A rootstock is part of a plant, often an underground part, from which new above-ground growth can be produced. It could also be described as a stem with a well developed root system, to which a bud from another plant is grafted. It can refer to a rhizome or underground stem. In grafting, it refers to a plant, sometimes just a stump, which already has an established, healthy root system, onto which a cutting or a bud from another plant is grafted. In some cases, such as vines of grapes and other berries, cuttings may be used for rootstocks, the roots being established in nursery conditions before planting them out. The plant part grafted onto the rootstock is usually called the scion. The scion is the plant that has the properties that propagator desires above ground, including the photosynthetic activity and the fruit or decorative properties. The rootstock is selected for its interaction with the soil, providing the roots and the stem to support the new plant, obtaining the necessary soil water and minerals, and resisting the relevant pests and diseases. After a few weeks, the tissues of the two parts will have grown together, eventually forming a single plant. After some years, it may be difficult to detect the site of the graft although the product always contains the components of two genetically different plants.

The use of rootstocks is most commonly associated with fruiting plants and trees, and is useful for mass propagating many other types of plants that do not breed true from seed, or are particularly susceptible to disease when grown on their own roots.

Although grafting has been practiced for many hundreds of years, even in Roman times, most orchard rootstocks in current use were developed in the 20th century.

A variety of rootstocks may be used for a single species or cultivar of scion because different rootstocks impart different properties, such as vigour, fruit size and precocity. Rootstocks also may be selected for traits such as resistance to drought, root pests, and diseases.  Grapevines for commercial planting are most often grafted onto rootstocks to avoid damage by phylloxera, though vines available for sale to back garden viticulturists may not be.

The rootstock may be a different species from the scion, but as a rule it should be closely related, for example, many commercial pears are grown on quince rootstock. Grafting can also be done in stages; a closely related scion is grafted to the rootstock, and a less closely related scion is grafted to the first scion. Serial grafting of several scions may also be used to produce a tree that bears several different fruit cultivars, with the same rootstock taking up and distributing water and minerals to the whole system. Those with more than three varieties are known as 'family trees'.

When it is difficult to match a plant to the soil in a certain field or orchard, growers may graft a scion onto a rootstock that is compatible with the soil. It may then be convenient to plant a range of ungrafted rootstocks to see which suit the growing conditions best; the fruiting characteristics of the scion may be considered later, once the most successful rootstock has been identified. Rootstocks are studied extensively and often are sold with a complete guide to their ideal soil and climate. Growers determine the pH, mineral content, nematode population, salinity, water availability, pathogen load and sandiness of their particular soil, and select a rootstock which is matched to it. Genetic testing is increasingly common, and new cultivars of rootstock are always being developed.

Uses in agriculture

AxR1
AxR1 is a grape rootstock once widely used in California viticulture. Its name is an abbreviation for "Aramon Rupestris Ganzin No. 1", which in turn is based on its parentage: a cross (made by a French grape hybridizer named Ganzin) between Aramon, a Vitis vinifera cultivar, and Rupestris, an American grape species, Vitis rupestrisalso used on its own as rootstock, "Rupestris St. George" or "St. George," referring to a town in the South of France, Saint Georges d'Orques, where it was popular.

It achieved a degree of notoriety in California when, after decades of recommendation as a preferred rootstockdespite repeated warnings from France and South Africa about its susceptibility (it had failed in Europe in the early 1900s)it ultimately succumbed to phylloxera in the 1980s, requiring the replanting of most of Napa and Sonoma, with disastrous financial consequences.  Those who resisted the urge to use AxR-1, such as David Bennion of Ridge Vineyards, saw their vineyards spared from phylloxera damage.

Apple rootstock 
Apple rootstocks are used for apple trees and are often the deciding factor of the size of the tree that is grafted onto the root. Dwarfing, semi-dwarf, semi-standard and standard are the size benchmarks for the different sizes of roots that will be grown, with the standard being the largest and dwarf being the smallest. Much of the world's apple production is now using dwarf rootstocks to improve efficiency, increase density and increase yields of fruit per acre. The following is a list of the dwarfing rootstock that are commonly used today in apple production:

Malling rootstocks 
Malling 7 rootstock is slightly bigger than an M26 rootstock, and also requires staking in the first several years to establish a centre leader. This rootstock is moderately susceptible to blight and collar rot. The fruit size that M7 produces is good but not as large as an M26, or M9 rootstock. This root is highly susceptible to suckering and leaning over in its later years of life, which is very annoying and causes issues for the producer.

Malling 9 rootstock is the most common and well known dwarfing rootstock. This rootstock should be planted in a well-drained site, and requires staking for the duration of its life. This rootstock is also very susceptible to fireblight and burr knots. There have been many clones made of this rootstock, including M.9 NAKB 337, M.9EMLA and M.9. Pajam.

Malling 26 rootstock will grow a larger tree than the M9 rootstock will, and is about 40-50% the size of a standard tree. This root is considered very productive and early bearing, and requires staking in the first few years of its life.

Malling Merton rootstocks 

Malling-Merton 106 rootstock is slightly smaller than MM 111, but is a very productive tree and has early fruiting abilities. It is a great rootstock to be used in a variety of soil conditions because it is very hardy with moderate vigour. This rootstock must be planted in well-drained soils as it is susceptible to collar rot.

Malling-Merton 111 rootstock is one of the biggest and vigorous rootstocks that is used today in commercial orchards, and is about 80-90% the size of a standard-sized tree. It is generally quite winter hardy and produces few burr knots and root suckers. This rootstock is much less popular than it once was, because many commercial producers are now planting higher density orchards, which M111 is not conducive to.

Tree Size

Other rootstocks 

R 5 = Robusta 5,  O 3 = Ottawa 3, M 27 = Malling 27, a) size compared to seedling of French crab.

Uses in Navigation and Orienteering
In the context of navigation, a rootstock is the base of a fallen tree.  Rootstocks are used as navigational aids on high-resolution maps and in the sport of orienteering. Because most woods have many fallen trees, only very large rootstocks generally are mapped.

See also
 Propagation of grapevines
 Fruit tree propagation
 Malling series
Apple rootstocks
Cherry rootstocks
Pear rootstocks
Plum rootstocks
Citrus rootstock

Notes

Bibliography

External links
 Rootstocks as an Element of Terroir, in Sommelier Journal

Horticulture
Plant reproduction
Plant roots